Race Against Time may refer to:

Film
 Race Against Time, a 2000 TV movie starring Eric Roberts
Ben 10: Race Against Time, a 2007 Ben 10 movie

Music
Race Against Time (band), an English heavy metal band
Race Against Time (album), a 2009 album by Wiley
Race Against Time: The Complete Clay Recordings, a 2007 compilation album by Charged GBH
"Race Against Time", a 1985 song by The Exploited from the album Horror Epics
"Race Against Time", a 1987 song by U2 from the album The Joshua Tree, B-side to "Where the Streets Have No Name"
"Race Against Time", a song by Ja Rule on his 1999 album Venni Vetti Vecci
"Race Against Time Part 2", a song by Tank featuring Ja Rule, from the 2001 album The Fast and the Furious
"Race Against Time II", a song by Ja Rule on his 2003 album Blood in My Eye

Books
Race Against Time (Nancy Drew), a Nancy Drew book
Race Against Time: Searching for Hope in AIDS-Ravaged Africa, a 2005 nonfiction book by Stephen Lewis
 Race Against Time, a 1973 science fiction book by Piers Anthony
 Race Against Time, a 1987 book by Jim Eyre & John Frankland on the formation and history of the Cave Rescue Organisation